The Alstom Movia (introduced as the Adtranz Movia and later sold as the Bombardier Movia) is a family of metro train cars designed by Adtranz and later built by Bombardier Transportation and Alstom. The structure and body shell are fully customisable for the needs of each system that orders it. Unlike most traditional metro trains, they usually have full-width gangways between carriages, allowing passengers to walk the entire length of the train. The design was developed by Adtranz, which was acquired by Bombardier in 2001. Since Alstom's acquisition of Bombardier in 2021, Alstom will be responsible for construction and delivery of future Movia metro train cars.

Guangzhou Metro (Lines 1 and 8), Shanghai Metro (Line 9), and Shenzhen Metro (Line 1) all use Movia 456 trains, while Bucharest Metro (excluding Line M4) use the Movia 346. Movia tube and sub-surface stock are in service on the London Underground (designated S Stock on the Circle, District, Hammersmith & City and Metropolitan lines and 2009 Stock on the Victoria line), Toronto subway (designated Toronto Rocket on Line 1 Yonge–University and Line 4 Sheppard), New York City Subway (designated R179), Bay Area Rapid Transit (designated D and E series) and Delhi Metro (Phase II only). Singapore MRT's North South and East West lines ordered 106 R151 Movia trains, one of the largest orders in Singapore.

Design 

The Movia is designed around a modular approach, which allows it to be adapted for use across a broad range of applications. While developed as a standardised platform, both the structure and carriage bodies of the train are able to be extensively modified to conform with the varied requirements of a given operator. Reportedly, the Movia can be modified to better suit local operational conditions, while the train's steering and management system is easily accessible for periodic maintenance. Reduced operating costs have been achieved via the careful designing of the train carriages to readily facilitate access for maintenance and repairs, as well as for low lifecycle costs and with concern for environmental conditions.

The Movia incorporates either a stainless steel or aluminium body, and an innovative propulsion system. Each carriage is outfitted with relatively modern passenger information systems and closed-circuit television (CCTV) systems. They feature modern interiors and exterior design; for favourable accessibility, they are normally furnished with both wide doors and spacious gangways. The carriages are also outfitted to provide relatively low interior noise levels, resulting in an improved environment for passengers.

The Movia train is powered by an advanced propulsion system, which is credited with achieving relatively low energy consumption, known as the MITrac (Modular Integrated Traction system). This propulsion and control system is capable of vehicles using 600 V–3 kV DC, 15–25 kV AC and diesel electric propulsion. Each carriage is outfitted with FLEXX Metro 1000, FLEXX Metro 2000, FLEXX Metro 3000 or FLEXX Eco lightweight bogies, which reportedly enable optimum usage of vehicle capacity with less energy consumption. Other features of note include strong steering performance.

Operators

Canada 

Toronto Transit Commission (Toronto subway)
80 six-car trains (480 cars in total) on the Yonge–University and Sheppard lines:  delivery began in October 2010 and the first train entered revenue service on July 21, 2011

China (mainland) 
Guangzhou Metro Movia 456 – 34 six-car units (204 cars).
Shanghai Metro – 134 six-car units (804 cars).
Shenzhen Metro – 22 six-car units (132 cars).

India 
Delhi Metro
77 eight-car trains (616 cars) – Phase II (58 sets in service)
Kanpur Metro
67 three car trains (201 cars), with Alstom branding

Romania 

Bucharest Metro
 44 Movia 346 trainsets (264 cars), built between 2002 and 2008

Singapore 
 SBS Transit (MRT)
 92 three car trains (276 cars), on the Downtown Line in 2013 under C951/C951A
 SMRT (MRT)
 106 six car trains (636 cars), on the North South Line and East West Line from 2022 onwards under R151

Sweden 

 Stockholm metro
 270 3-car C20 Movia sets (810 cars) originally built by Kalmar Verkstad and Adtranz (later acquired by Bombardier), as well as one 3-car C20F Movia set built by Bombardier with "FICAS" technology.
 96 4-car C30 Movia sets (384 cars) have been ordered to be used as 48 full-length trains on the Red line. The first units were delivered in mid-2018 and entered passenger service in August 2020. The last units are expected to be delivered in 2022.

United Kingdom 

London Underground
47 trains – Movia tube stock, 8 car (2009 Stock) for the Victoria line
192 trains – Movia sub-surface stock, 7 or 8 car (S Stock) for the Metropolitan, Hammersmith & City, Circle and District lines
Total of 1779 cars

United States 
Bay Area Rapid Transit
775 Fleet of the Future cars
New York City Subway
318 R179 cars

Production 
 Kalmar, Småland, Sweden – Swedish order only for C20
 LEW Hennigsdorf, Hennigsdorf, Germany – former Lokomotivbau-Elektrotechnische Werke (later Adtranz/AEG Schienenfahrzeuge GmbH) – European orders outside of UK and initial cars for Delhi Metro
 Changchun Alstom Railway Vehicles Co,. Ltd., Changchun, China – joint venture plant with CRRC Changchun Railway Vehicles Co., Ltd. – Chinese and Singapore orders
 Savli Railcar and Electrical Component Manufacturing Plant, Vadodara, Gujarat, India – most cars for Delhi Metro and all cars for Kanpur Metro
 Thunder Bay, Ontario, Canada – former Canadian Car and Foundry plant (Hawker Siddeley Canada/UTDC) – Toronto order
 Derby Litchurch Lane Works, England, United Kingdom – London Underground order
 Plattsburgh, New York, USA – BART and New York City Subway orders
 Pittsburg, California, USA – BART order

See also 
 Alstom Metropolis
 Siemens Inspiro

Notes

References

External links 

Movia official web site

Alstom multiple units
Bombardier Transportation multiple units
Bucharest Metro passenger equipment
Train-related introductions in 2001